Tosena melanoptera is a cicada species from Southeast Asia. It was described by White in 1846 from material collected in North India. It has also been recorded from Thailand and Vietnam.

References

Insects described in 1846
Fauna of Thailand
Taxa named by Adam White (zoologist)
Tosenini